Paul Handforth (born 6 October 1981), also known by the nickname of "Tiger", is a professional rugby league footballer who most recently played for Keighley in the Championship 1.

Background
Paul Handforth was born in Wakefield, West Yorkshire, England, he is the son of the rugby league footballer who played in the 1960s, 1970s and 1980s for Wakefield Trinity (Heritage No. 755), Hunslet (Heritage No. 1193) and Oldham (Heritage No. 850); Tony "Tiger" Handforth.

Playing career

He has previously played for Halifax, the Batley Bulldogs, Doncaster, the Wakefield Trinity Wildcats, and the Castleford Tigers (Heritage № 822) in the Super League. He started playing rugby with the Methley Monarchs ARLFC as a schoolboy and also played for the Oulton Raiders.

Handforth is an Ireland international. 
 
He was named in the Ireland training squad for the 2008 Rugby League World Cup.

After leaving Keighley and retiring from the professional game, Handforth joined amateur team Fryston Warriors, and played for them against Keighley in the 2017 Challenge Cup third round tie between the two clubs.

References

External links
(archived by web.archive.org) Statistics at thecastlefordtigers.co.uk

1981 births
Living people
Batley Bulldogs players
Castleford Tigers players
Doncaster R.L.F.C. players
English people of Irish descent
Featherstone Rovers players
Halifax R.L.F.C. players
Ireland national rugby league team players
Keighley Cougars players
Rugby league five-eighths
Rugby league players from Wakefield
Wakefield Trinity players